The canton of Lamballe-Armor (before 2021: Lamballe) is an administrative division of the Côtes-d'Armor department, northwestern France. Its borders were modified at the French canton reorganisation which came into effect in March 2015. Its seat is in Lamballe-Armor.

It consists of the following communes:
 
Andel
Coëtmieux
Hénansal
Lamballe-Armor (partly)
Landéhen
La Malhoure
Noyal
Pommeret
Quintenic
Saint-Rieul

References

Cantons of Côtes-d'Armor